Flaka Goranci (born 15 July 1985 in Gjakova-Kosovo) is a Kosovo-Austrian Opera singer.

Early life

Goranci was born in Gjakove, Kosovo to Flamur Goranci an Electrical engineer and a mother Doctor of Endocrinology and Internist Ilirjana Hana Goranci. At an early age she started studying Piano at her home town in Gjakova and as 9 years old she won the kids singing contest Zeri me i bukur femijeror.

Education and career

She entered the University of Arts (Tirana) in 2004 to study singing. In 2008 she continued her master's degree at Buchmann-Mehta School of Music at Tel Aviv University.  Goranci began her professional career after moving to Vienna. She worked with Nicolaus Harnoncourt, Gustav Kuhn, Ulrich Windfuhr, Pawel Poplawski, Enrico Delamboye, Manfred Mayrhofer, among others. With opera directors like Uwe Eric Laufenberg, Stephen Lawless, Carlos Wagner, Niv Hoffman, Andrea Zogg, Ulrich Schulz, Dani Ehrlich and Michal Grover Friedlander. She performed with Hamburg Symphony Orchestra, Concentus Musicus Wien, Dubrovnik Symphony Orchestra, Kosovo Philharmonic, Macedonian philharmonic Orchestra, Albanian Symphonic Orchestra and so on.
She has performed at  Vienna Konzerthaus, Vienna Musikverein, Theater an der Wien, Magdeburg Theatre, Alden Biesen Castle, Vatroslav Lisinski Concert Hall, among others.

Repertoire

Her repertoire includes roles of Carmen Carmen, Charlotte  Werther, Dido Dido and Aeneas, Cherubino  Le Nozze Di Figaro, Dorabella Così fan tutte, Rosina Il Barbiere di Siviglia, Olga Eugene Onegin (opera), Third wood sprite Rusalka (opera), among others.

Discography
In 2015 she released the album Albanian Flowers with rearranged old songs from Albania and Kosovo.

References

External links
 

1985 births
Living people
Kosovan women singers
21st-century Austrian women opera singers